Cleopatrick (stylized in lowercase) is a Canadian rock duo based out of Cobourg, Ontario. They have their own record label, called Nowhere Special Recordings.

Background 
Childhood friends Ian Fraser and Luke Gruntz grew up in Cobourg, Ontario had been friends since age 4 and began getting interested in music around age 8 when they first listened to AC/DC. Later in their teens they began recording their own music.

Their debut EP, titled "14" was released on 14 February 2016, though they began to gain popularity with single "Hometown". Released in 2017, it peaked at No. 6 on the US Mainstream Rock Charts. It was taken from their second EP, The Boys, which was released on 29 June 2018. The band's first music festival was the 2018 instalment of Lollapalooza in Chicago, and continuing into 2019 they played many festivals, including 2000 Trees Festival in England and Shaky Knees Music Festival in Atlanta,  Non-album single "Sanjake" was released in March 2019.

On 11 December 2020, they released the single "Good Grief", the first single of their debut album, titled Bummer. This was followed on 11 March 2021 with second single "The Drake". The third single, "Family Van" was released on 20 April 2021 alongside the announcement of their debut album, which was released on 4 June 2021.

Cleopatrick began an extensive European tour throughout March 2022 including a performance at the Electric Ballroom in London. Following their European tour, they went on to support British rock Duo Royal Blood during their North American tour between 18 April 2022 and 24 May 2022. Following that tour, Cleopatrick performed at multiple European festivals including Reading and Leeds on the 26th & 27th of August 2022 respectively.

The single, "OK" was released on 23 August 2022, part of their 5-song EP Doom which released on the 21 October 2022.

Musical style 
The band has drawn comparisons in their sound and personal reflection of music to bands such as Highly Suspect, Royal Blood, Arctic Monkeys, and Catfish and the Bottlemen.

The band has also stated AC/DC, Highly Suspect, Zig Mentality, and Ready The Prince as their biggest musical influences, along with the stylings and musical risk taking associated with modern hip hop.

Discography

Studio albums

Extended plays

Singles

Music videos

Notes

Members 
 Luke Gruntz – vocals, guitar, production
 Ian Fraser – drums, production

References

External links 
 Official website

Canadian indie rock groups
Canadian blues rock musical groups
Musical groups established in 2015
Musical groups from Ontario
Cobourg
Rock music duos
Canadian musical duos
2015 establishments in Ontario
Thirty Tigers artists